2016 United States Olympic Trials may refer to:

 2016 United States Olympic Trials (swimming)
 2016 United States Olympic Trials (track and field)